Kosli is a town and "tehsil" in the Rewari district of Haryana in India. It comes in Ahirwal (a region dominated by Ahir/Yadav community). It is situated 80 kilometers South-West from Delhi. Kosli Tehsil is part of  National Capital Region.

History
According to Haryana State Gazetteer, Kosli was founded in 1193 A.D. by Kosal Dev Singh, the grandson of King of Delhi. Kosal Dev Singh said to have met the sage Baba Mukteshwar Puri, Kosli engaged in meditation at Koshalgarh Kosli, which was then a dense shrub jungle.

During British Raj there were as many as 70 senior Commissioned Officers and 150 Junior Commissioned Officers in Kosli. 247 soldiers from Kosli participated in the First World War between 1914-1918. Many have been decorated with medals, to quantify- 3 Indian Order of Merit, 1 Military Cross, 2 Ashoka Chakras, 1 Mahavir Chakras, 2 Shaurya Chakras,  4 COAS Commendation, 1  Police Medal. Village also includes several recipients of different military honours during British rule.

References

Cities and towns in Rewari district